"Años Luz" (English: "Light Years") is a song by American singer Romeo Santos with Dominican singing duo Monchy & Alexandra. It is the tenth single for Santos' fourth studio album Utopía (2019). This is also the first song between Monchy and Alexandra since their split in 2008. The duo reunited only for this song as they continued with their solo career. The music video was released on September 5, 2019.

Charts

References 

2019 singles
2019 songs
Bachata songs
Romeo Santos songs
Spanish-language songs
Sony Music Latin singles
Songs written by Romeo Santos